Oxynoemacheilus paucilepis, the  Mancilik dwarf loach is a species of ray-finned fish in the genus Oxynoemacheilus. This species is endemic to the Mancilik, Cetinkaya and Kalkam streams I the headwaters of the Euphrates in eastern Anatolia, Turkey. It may have been extirpated from the Mancilik after none were found at the type locality in 2008 but it was found to be abundant at another locality on the same stream in 2009. Its preferred habitat is small streams with gravel beds and a moderately fast current.

References

paucilepis
Endemic fauna of Turkey
Fish described in 2007
Taxa named by Füsun Erk'akan
Taxa named by Teodor T. Nalbant
Taxa named by Cevher Özeren